This is a ranking list of Taiwanese wealthy people. The following is based on the annual estimated wealth and assets assessment compiled and published by American business magazine Forbes. The wealth of 51 people exceeds $ 1 billion. Forbes does not include in the list all entrepreneurs and investors who have citizenship of the country.

2022 list
The fifty-one billionaires are listed as follows, including their Taiwanese rank (R#) and world rank (W#), citizenship, age, net worth, and source of wealth:

See also
 The World's Billionaires
 List of countries by the number of billionaires

References

Lists of people by wealth
Net worth
 
People